Duck Dodgers Starring Daffy Duck (known as Daffy Duck Starring As Duck Dodgers in PAL regions) is a platform video game for the Nintendo 64 released in 2000. Based on the 1953 theatrical cartoon, the player takes control of Daffy Duck and explores five fictional planets and saves the Earth. The object is to collect energy atoms to unlock the boss areas and defeat the bosses, whom upon defeating, opens up the next planet. This game has Rumble Pak support and allows the player to save the game directly to the cartridge with the battery back-up, rather than using a Controller Pak, as many other third-party titles on the Nintendo 64 used such to save game data.

Plot
Marvin the Martian has developed an ultimate weapon that will allow him to finally destroy Earth, which will ultimately allow him to take control of the universe. Upon the demonstration of the weapon, a slight snag hinders Marvin from completing his devious deed. The weapon is out of atoms, which it runs on, so he sends his minions (all of which are characters from the Looney Tunes universe) to gather atoms to fuel his weapon. 

Duck Dodgers is informed by his academy of Marvin's deeds and sets out to find the one-hundred Atoms before Marvin can. This ultimately has Dodgers and his sidekick, Cadet, trekking to four different planets, including a large pirate ship, to obtain the upper-hand over Marvin.

Reception

IGN gave Duck Dodgers Starring Daffy Duck a good 7.6 out of 10 overall praising the game's presentation but had criticism with the blurry graphics and the gameplay because of "super loose control and difficult camera movements". Overall reviews were mixed.  GameRankings gave it a score of 72.73%, while Metacritic gave it 69 out of 100.

References

External links

2000 video games
3D platform games
Infogrames games
Video games featuring Daffy Duck
Nintendo 64 games
Nintendo 64-only games
Duck Dodgers
Video games developed in the United States
Video games set on fictional planets
Fiction set in the 24th century
Cartoon Network video games
Paradigm Entertainment games
Single-player video games